Emi Nakamura is a Canadian-American economist. She is the Chancellor's Professor of Economics at University of California, Berkeley.

Nakamura is a research associate and co-director of the Monetary Economics Program of the National Bureau of Economic Research, and a co-editor of the American Economic Review.

Education 
Nakamura graduated summa cum laude from Princeton University with an A.B. in economics in 2001, completing a senior thesis titled "An Economy with Monetary Business Cycles" under the supervision of Michael Woodford. Nakamura then went on to pursue graduate studies in economics at Harvard University, receiving a Ph.D. in economics in 2007 after completing her doctoral dissertation, titled "Price Adjustment, Pass-through and Monetary Policy", under the supervision of Robert Barro and Ariel Pakes.

Research 
Nakamura's research focuses on empirical issues in macroeconomics, including price stickiness, the impact of fiscal shocks, and measurement errors in official statistics. Her citation for the John Bates Clark Medal from the American Economic Association states that Nakamura has "greatly increased our understanding of price-setting by firms and the effects of monetary and fiscal policies", noting her "creativity in suggesting new sources of data to address long-standing questions.". Emi Nakamura is a prominent figure in the field of New Keynesian Economics. New Keynesian Economics incorporates microeconomic theories and ideas and places them into macroeconomic theories. Nakamura demonstrates this in her work, “Five facts about prices”, by including microdata from the Bureau of Labor Statistics to prove macroeconomic ideas." In her most cited work, "Five facts about prices", she and Jón Steinsson showed that many measured price changes are due to temporary sales, scheduled far in advance, rather than happening as dynamic responses to economic conditions. This suggested that even though economic data features frequent price changes, this can be compatible with macroeconomic models featuring substantial price rigidity. In another highly cited work, "Fiscal stimulus in a monetary union", she and Jón Steinsson use variation in US government military spending across states to estimate the open-economy government spending multiplier, finding values substantially higher than one. This confirms the prediction of Keynesian macroeconomic models that fiscal stimulus can have substantial effects on output, particularly at the zero lower bound.

Recognition
She was awarded the John Bates Clark Medal and elected as a member of the American Academy of Arts and Sciences in 2019. She has been awarded an NSF Career Grant and Sloan Research Fellowship, and was the 2014 recipient of the Elaine Bennett Research Prize, She was also named one of the top 25 economists under 45 in 2014 by the IMF and named one of "the decade’s eight best young economists" in 2018 by The Economist. In 2021 she was named a Fellow of the Econometric Society.

Personal life 
Nakamura is married to fellow economist and frequent co-author Jón Steinsson, with whom she has two children and is the daughter of economists Alice Nakamura and Masao Nakamura and the granddaughter of economist Guy Orcutt.

Selected works

Inflation and price dispersion

Monetary policy

Fiscal policy

Economic crises

References 

|-

}

1980 births
21st-century American economists
American academics of Japanese descent
American women economists
Canadian emigrants to the United States
Canadian people of Japanese descent
Canadian women economists
Columbia University faculty
Fellows of the American Academy of Arts and Sciences
Fellows of the Econometric Society
Harvard University alumni
Living people
Princeton University alumni
21st-century American women